The 2001 Big Ten men's basketball tournament was the postseason men's basketball tournament for the Big Ten Conference and was played from March 8 to March 11, 2001 at the United Center in Chicago, Illinois. The championship was won by Iowa who defeated Indiana in the championship game. As a result,  Iowa received the Big Ten's automatic bid to the NCAA tournament.

Due to NCAA sanctions, Ohio State has vacated the records from this tournament.

Seeds

All Big Ten schools participated in the tournament. Teams were seeded by conference record, with a tiebreaker system used to seed teams with identical conference records. Seeding for the tournament was determined at the close of the regular conference season. The top five teams received a first round bye.

Bracket

Source

Game summaries

Opening round

Quarterfinals

Semifinals

Championship

All-Tournament team 
 Reggie Evans, Iowa – Big Ten tournament Most Outstanding Player
 Brian Cook, Illinois
 Kirk Haston, Indiana
 Jared Jeffries, Indiana
 Joe Crispin, Penn State

References

Big Ten men's basketball tournament
Tournament
Big Ten men's basketball tournament
Big Ten men's basketball tournament